McCurdy may refer to:

McCurdy (surname), includes a list of people with the name
McCurdy Charter School, public school in Española, New Mexico, U.S
McCurdy Field, stadium in Frederick, Maryland, U.S.
McCurdy Hotel, historic building in Evansville, Indiana, U.S.

See also
McCurdy's, former New York department store chain